"Monday Morning" is a song by Canadian R&B singer Melanie Fiona from her debut album, The Bridge (2009). The song was Produced by Peter Wade Keusch and Sidh Solanki, written by Peter Wade Keusch, Sidh Solanki, and Charlene Gilliam, and recorded at LaBronze Johnson Studios, NYC.  It was released as the third single for the United States, as the song received airplay on adult top 40 radio stations.  It was released to radio stations in Canada because hot adult contemporary radio station CKZZ-FM (Virgin Radio 953) in Vancouver played it starting April 2010, which made Monday Morning the fifth single from The Bridge released in Canada.  In addition, another Canadian add was on Galaxie's Pop Adult channel.

Chart performance
"Monday Morning" debuted on the Swiss Singles Chart at number eighty on the issue date of October 25, 2009, and has since peaked at number one. The song has become successful in Poland, Austria and Hungary.

Weekly charts

Year-end charts

Certifications

See also 
List of number-one singles of the 2000s (Switzerland)
List of number-one singles in 2010 (Hungary)
List of number-one singles of 2010 (Poland)

References

2009 singles
Number-one singles in Poland
Number-one singles in Switzerland
Melanie Fiona songs
Songs written by Peter Wade Keusch
Neo soul songs
Song recordings produced by Peter Wade Keusch
Songs written by Charlie Vox